James T. Murray (February 9, 1901 – July 11, 1936) was an American film actor best known for starring in the 1928 film The Crowd.

Early life
Born in The Bronx, Murray was the second of seven children of Mary (née Casserly) and Christopher Murray. His mother was a native of Ireland, as was his father, who by 1910 was employed in New York as an insurance inspector for the Metropolitan Life Insurance Company.

Career
In 1923, Murray made his film debut as Captain John Alden in the Pilgrims, a three-reel production shot at Yale University in New Haven, Connecticut and surrounding area locations. In 1924, Murray moved to Hollywood with hopes of continuing an acting career. Over the next three years, Murray found film work, mostly as an extra. In 1927, Murray got his break when he was "discovered" by director King Vidor who was then in pre-production for his next film, The Crowd. Vidor saw Murray walking near the casting office on the M-G-M lot and thought Murray looked right for the lead role. Murray, however, failed to show up for a meeting arranged by Vidor, apparently thinking the prospective offer was a joke. Vidor tracked Murray down and eventually cast him as “the ordinary man as hero” John Sims. Upon its premiere in March 1928, The Crowd was a critical and financial success and Murray's performance was lauded by both the critics and the public. Shortly before working in Vidor's production, Murray also starred alongside Joan Crawford in Rose-Marie,  released in February 1928.

Following The Crowd, Murray appeared in the Warner Bros. comedy The Little Wildcat. Later that year, he starred opposite Lon Chaney in The Big City, followed by a supporting role in Chaney's final silent film Thunder in 1929. Thunder would also be Murray's last film for M-G-M in which he had a significant role. In 1929, Murray made the transition from silent to sound films in the part-talkie The Shakedown for Universal Pictures.

By 1930, Murray's once promising career had begun to falter due to his increasing alcoholism and alcohol related arrests. In August 1930, Murray was sentenced to six months in jail for appearing in court drunk on a previous drunk-driving charge. After serving four months of hard labor, Murray was released and attempted to reignite his acting career. He stopped drinking for a time and, in February 1933, he signed a seven-year contract with First National Pictures and Warner Bros. The same year, he married "Miss Florida" Marion Sayers. The marriage and Murray's sobriety proved to be short lived: Sayers was granted a divorce in November 1933 on the grounds that Murray drank excessively and forced Sayers to work to support him.

By 1934, Murray was unable to secure acting work due to his alcoholism and began panhandling. Director King Vidor, who had cast Murray in The Crowd seven years earlier, was then casting his upcoming film Our Daily Bread (1934), immediately thought of Murray for the lead role. Vidor had heard about Murray's plight and set about finding him. Vidor found a much heavier and unkempt Murray panhandling on the street and offered to buy him a drink. Vidor then offered Murray the lead role in Our Daily Bread, provided Murray pull himself together. Murray rejected the offer and reportedly stated, "Just because I stop you on the street and try to borrow a buck you think you can tell me what to do. As far as I am concerned, you know what you can do with your lousy part."

Murray appeared in a total of thirty six films over the course of his twelve-year film career. In the majority of his films in the sound era, particularly those made during the last few years of his career, he was cast in bit parts or as an uncredited extra. Murray's final onscreen appearance was as an uncredited “Earthquake Survivor” in the 1936 disaster drama San Francisco.

Death
On July 11, 1936, Murray drowned after falling or jumping from the North River pier in New York City. The medical examiner determined that the cause was "asphyxia by submersion," without ruling on whether his death was an accident or suicide. He was interred at the Calvary Cemetery in Woodside, Queens, New York.

Decades later Vidor, haunted by Murray's decline and early death,  wrote a screenplay titled The Actor, although his work never was produced.

Selected filmography

References

External links

 
 
 James Murray at Virtual History
  (Murray's first film)

1901 births
1936 deaths
20th-century American male actors
American male film actors
American male silent film actors
Burials at Calvary Cemetery (Queens)
Deaths by drowning in the United States
Male actors from New York City
People from the Bronx